AZF is a terrorist group based in France. The first record of the group was in Spring 2004. The group is believed to have taken its name from the explosion of the AZF chemical factory in Toulouse in 2001.

History 
The group attempted to extort money from the French government by threatening to place explosives along the nation's rail lines. The French government tried to pay them twice, but the first time the government helicopter was unable to find the transfer point and on the second occasion could not take off because of fog. The French government placed ads in the newspaper Libération to contact the terrorists.

They led French railway workers to a bomb, allowing it to be neutralized. A week or so later another bomb was found on the TGV train tracks, but it was not armed and was different from the previous one. It is unsure if this was the work of AZF.

In March 2004, a letter stated that they were temporarily stopping their operations due to logistical problems. It is still unclear whether this letter was from the real AZF.

The authors were not identified and their motivations are still unclear. The most probable hypothesis is the money. They probably stopped their activity because of the train bombings in Madrid on 11 March 2004.

References 

Extortionists
Paramilitary organizations based in France